Marie-Angélique Lacordelle (born 19 January 1987) is a French sprinter who specialized in the 400 metres.

She was born in Cayenne, French Guiana. She reached the semi-final in her individual event at the 2006 World Junior Championships, and in the 4 x 400 metres relay she competed at the 2007 World Championships without reaching the final.

Her personal best times are 23.94 seconds in the 200 metres, achieved in July 2006 in Mannheim; and 52.59 seconds in the 400 metres, achieved in August 2007 in Niort.

Achievements

References

1987 births
Living people
French female sprinters
French Guianan female sprinters
Sportspeople from Cayenne
French people of French Guianan descent